Provocative Percussion is a studio album by Enoch Light and The Light Brigade, also known as the Command All-Stars. It was released in 1959 on Command Records (catalog no. RS 806-SD). The album cover artwork is by abstract painter Josef Albers, like its predecessor.

Provocative Percussion debuted on the Billboard magazine pop album chart on January 25, 1960, held the No. 2 spot for five weeks, and remained on the chart for 69 weeks.

AllMusic gave the album a rating of five stars. Reviewer Lindsay Planer called it "a highly recommended kitsch-classic."

Track listing 
Side A
 "You're the Top" (Cole Porter) [2:34]
 "Somebody Loves Me" (Gershwin, DeSylva, MacDonald) [2:42]
 "Blues in the Night" (Arlen, Mercer) [4:12]
 "Perhaps, Perhaps, Perhaps" (Farres) [2:35]
 "Love for Sale" (Cole Porter) [2:50]
 "Fascinating Rhythm" (Gershwin) [2:35]

Side B
 "S'Wonderful" (Gershwin) [2:18]
 "Mood Indigo" (Ellington, Mills, Bigard) [2:51]
 "Ain't Misbehavin'" (Razaf, Brook, Waller) [3:19]
 "The Man I Love" (Gershwin) [2:35]
 "Song of India" (N. Rimsky-Korsakoff) [3:12]
 "Mad About the Boy" (Coward) [2:48]

Credits
 Bobby Byrne
 Charles Magnante
 Bob Haggart
 Tony Mottola
 Willie Rodriguez
 Moe Wechsler
 Urbie Green
 Terry Snyder
 Pee Wee Erwin
 Artie Marotti
 Dominic Cortese
 Ezelle Watson
 Russ Banzer
 Stanley Webb
 Milt Yaner
 Leonard Calderon
 George Dessinger
 Bernie Kaufman

References

Enoch Light albums
1959 albums
Command Records albums
Albums with cover art by Josef Albers